Bhoomi Geetha  is a 1997 Indian Kannada language film, starring Atul Kulkarni and Vinaya Prasad.

Plot
A tribal community faces cultural and ecological displacement when a dam is constructed in their native land.

Cast 
 Lokesh
 Vinaya Prasad
 Atul Kulkarni
 Manju Bhashini

Awards 
45th National Film Awards
 Best Film on Environment Conservation/Preservation — R. Mahadeva Gowda, Geetha Mahadeva Gowda, H. K. Narakesari

 1997–98 Karnataka State Film Awards
 Special Film of Social Concern — R. Mahadeva Gowda, Geetha Mahadeva Gowda, H. K. Narakesari

1997 Screen Awards
 Best Film — R. Mahadeva Gowda, Geetha Mahadeva Gowda, H. K. Narakesari
 Best Director (Kannada) — Kesari Haravu

References

External links

1990s Kannada-language films
1997 films
Films scored by Ilaiyaraaja
Best Film on Environment Conservation/Preservation National Film Award winners